President Marcos may refer to:

Ferdinand Marcos (1917–1989), 10th President of the Philippines and father of Bongbong Marcos
Bongbong Marcos (Ferdinand Marcos Jr.) (born 1957), 17th President of the Philippines and son of Ferdinand Marcos

See also
 Marcos (disambiguation)